Sphingosine-1-phosphate phosphatase 1 is an enzyme that in humans is encoded by the SGPP1 gene.

References

Further reading